The Anderson Bridge is a bridge built in 1953, which crosses the Northwest Miramichi River, and forms part of Route 8, the highway between Miramichi and Fredericton, New Brunswick, Canada. Originally a two-lane bridge, after structural deficiencies were revealed, it was indefinitely reduced to one lane of traffic, with lights at both sides. A new bridge with a posted speed limit of 100 km/h will be built replacing the Anderson Bridge, slated to be opened in 2021.

References

Road bridges in New Brunswick
Bridges completed in 1953
1953 establishments in New Brunswick